A currency is a particular authorized monetary system, monetized in specific units (e.g., euros, dollars, pesos, etc.) which may be given international value by their exchange values in foreign exchange.

Currency may also refer to:

Economics and finance
Currency, in economics, may refer to:
 Banknotes, the paper or non-metal circulating medium of exchange of a country
 Banknotes and coins, all circulating media of exchange of a particular government
 Money, any generally accepted medium of exchange, including non-physical media

Some types of currency include:
 Complementary currency (or alternative currency), a currency or medium of exchange which is not a national currency (i.e., not legal tender), but which is thought of as supplementing or complementing national currencies
 Cryptocurrency (or crypto currency), a digital asset designed to work as a medium of exchange that uses cryptography to secure its transactions, to control the creation of additional units, and to verify the transfer of asset
 Digital currency  (or digital money or electronic currency or electronic money), a type of currency available only in digital, not physical, form (such as banknotes and coins)
 Fiat currency or fiat money, a currency without intrinsic value established as money, often by government regulation
 Virtual currency (or virtual money), a type of unregulated, digital money, which is issued and usually controlled by its developers, and used and accepted among the members of a specific virtual community

Arts, entertainment, and media
 Currency (album), an album by the rapper Lil' Keke
 Currency (film), a 2009 Malayalam film by Swathy Bhaskar
 Currency, an imprint of Crown Publishing Group

Other uses
 Currency (typography), a character used to denote a currency
 Currency lads and lasses, colonial-born Australians

See also 

 
 Currensy (born 1981), American rapper
 Currence, Dutch payment organization 
Monopoly money
Play money
Scrip